Røros landsogn is a former municipality in the old Sør-Trøndelag county in Norway. The  municipality encompassed the southern part of the what is now the municipality of Røros in Trøndelag county. The municipality nearly surrounded the small enclave that was the mining town of Røros and it stretched all the way southeast to the lake Femunden and the Swedish border.  The administrative centre of the municipality was located in the town of Røros where Røros Church is located.

History
The rural part of the parish of Røros was established as the municipality of Røros landsogn in 1926 when the large municipality of Røros was split into four separate municipalities: Glåmos (population: 983), Brekken (population: 1,098), Røros landsogn (population: 701), and the town of Røros (population: 2,284). During the 1960s, there were many municipal mergers across Norway due to the work of the Schei Committee. On 1 January 1964, the four municipalities of Glåmos (population: 700), Brekken (population: 964), Røros landsogn (population: 482), and the town of Røros (population: 3,063) were all reunited under the name Røros.

Name
The municipality is named after the town of Røros and the name  means "rural district", hence it it the rural district surrounding the town of Røros. The town is named after the old Røros farm. The first element comes from the local river name Røa  which has an unknown meaning.

Government
While it existed, this municipality was responsible for primary education (through 10th grade), outpatient health services, senior citizen services, unemployment, social services, zoning, economic development, and municipal roads. During its existence, this municipality was governed by a municipal council of elected representatives, which in turn elected a mayor.

Mayors
The mayors of Røros landsogn:

 1926–1931: Hans T. Galaaen (Bp)
 1932–1933: John O. Indseth (Bp)
 1934–1941: Per A. Sundt (Ap)
 1942–1945: Haldor Thomassen Galaaen (NS)
 1945–1951: Jens Tørresdal (Ap)
 1952–1955: Per A. Sundt (Ap)
 1956–1959: Bernhard Solli (Ap)
 1960–1963: Oddleif Vold (Ap)

Municipal council
The municipal council  of Røros landsogn was made up of 13 representatives that were elected to four year terms. The party breakdown of the final municipal council was as follows:

See also
List of former municipalities of Norway

References

Røros
Former municipalities of Norway
1926 establishments in Norway
1964 disestablishments in Norway